Gnorismoneura grandiprocessa is a moth of the family Tortricidae. It is found in China.

The wingspan is 12-13.5 mm for males and 15-17.5 mm for females. The ground color of the forewings is yellowish brown with dark brown patterns. The hindwings are dark gray.

Etymology
The specific name is derived from the Latin words grandis (meaning large), and processus (meaning process) and refers to the large lateral processes of the gnathos.

References

Moths described in 2004
Archipini